Jim Barnes (born c. 1959) is a former American football player and coach. He served as the head football coach at Wooster College in Wooster, Ohio from 1995 to 1999 and his alma mater, Augustana College in Rock Island, Illinois, from 2000 to 2010, compiling a career college football coaching record of 116–47.

Head coaching record

College

References

1959 births
Year of birth uncertain
Living people
American football defensive backs
Augustana (Illinois) Vikings football coaches
Augustana (Illinois) Vikings football players
Marietta Pioneers football coaches
Ohio Wesleyan Battling Bishops football coaches
Wooster Fighting Scots football coaches
University of Illinois College of Law alumni